The 87th (1st Nassau) Infantry Regiment (German: 1. Nassauisches Infanterie-Regiment Nr. 87) was an infantry regiment, part of the 41st Infantry Brigade and the 21st Division. The unit was created in the year 1809, and they were garrisoned in the city of Mainz.

The 87th infantry regiment also had very distinctive uniforms, since unlike their German and Dutch counterparts the Nassau regiment was equipped with dark green uniforms and yellow baldric's on both shoulders where as the officers wore dark green uniforms and a white baldric on the right shoulder.

See also
List of Imperial German infantry regiments

Regiments of the German Army in World War I
Military units and formations established in 1809
Military units and formations disestablished in 1919